The San Francisco Bay Area Film Critics Circle (SFBAFCC), formerly known as San Francisco Film Critics Circle, was founded in 2002 as an organization of film journalists and critics from San Francisco, California based publications.

Included in its membership are journalists from San Francisco Chronicle, San Jose Mercury News, Oakland Tribune, Contra Costa Times, San Francisco Bay Guardian, SF Weekly, East Bay Express, San Jose Metro, Palo Alto Weekly, NorthBay biz, The San Francisco Examiner, KRON-TV, Variety, Bleeding Cool, CultureVulture.net, Splicedwire.com, and CombustibleCelluloid.com.

SFBAFCC Awards
In December of each year, the SFFCC meets to vote on the San Francisco Bay Area Film Critics Circle awards for the films released in the same calendar year.

Categories of awards include:
 Best Actor
 Best Actress
 Best Cinematography
 Best Director
 Best Documentary Film
 Best Film
 Best Foreign Language Film
 Best Animated Feature
 Best Supporting Actor
 Best Supporting Actress
 Best Adapted Screenplay (2006–present)
 Best Original Screenplay (2006–present)
 Best Screenplay (2004–2005)

Multiple award winners
 6 awards:
 Sideways (2004): Best Actor, Director, Picture, Screenplay, Supporting Actor, and Supporting Actress
 Moonlight (2016): Best Picture, Director, Screenplay, Supporting Actor, Cinematography, and Editing
 4 awards:
 Milk (2008): Best Picture, Director, Actor, and Original Screenplay
 Boyhood (2014): Best Picture, Director, Supporting Actress, and Editing
 3 awards:
 Brokeback Mountain (2005): Best Actor, Director and Picture
 Little Children (2006): Best Picture, Adapted Screenplay and Supporting Actor
 The Social Network (2010): Best Picture, Best Director and Adapted Screenplay
 The Tree of Life (2011): Best Picture, Best Director and Best Cinematography
 Birdman (2014): Best Actor, Best Supporting Actor, and Best Original Screenplay
 Mad Max: Fury Road (2015): Best Director, Best Editing, and Best Cinematography
 Parasite (2019): Best Director, Best Original Screenplay, Best Foreign Language Film
 2 awards:
 Lost in Translation (2003): Best Actor and Best Picture
 The Assassination of Jesse James by the Coward Robert Ford (2007): Best Picture and Best Supporting Actor
 Away from Her (2007): Best Actress and Best Adapted Screenplay
 The Wrestler (2008): Best Actor and Best Supporting Actress
 The Dark Knight (2008): Best Supporting Actor and Best Cinematography
 The Hurt Locker (2009): Best Picture and Best Director
 The King's Speech (2010): Best Actor and Best Original Screenplay
 Tinker Tailor Soldier Spy (2011): Best Actor and Best Adapted Screenplay
 Lincoln (2012): Best Supporting Actor and Best Adapted Screenplay
 Brooklyn (2015): Best Actress and Best Adapted Screenplay
 Love & Mercy (2015): Best Actor and Best Original Screenplay
 Arrival (2016): Best Adapted Screenplay and Best Editing
 Fences (2016): Best Actor and Best Supporting Actress
 The Handmaiden (2016): Best Foreign Language Film and Best Production Design
 The Florida Project (2017): Best Picture and Best Supporting Actor
 The Shape of Water (2017): Best Director and Best Production Design

Award ceremonies
 2002: 1st San Francisco Film Critics Circle Awards
 2003: 2nd San Francisco Film Critics Circle Awards
 2004: 3rd San Francisco Film Critics Circle Awards
 2005: 4th San Francisco Film Critics Circle Awards
 2006: 5th San Francisco Film Critics Circle Awards
 2007: 6th San Francisco Film Critics Circle Awards
 2008: 7th San Francisco Film Critics Circle Awards
 2009: 8th San Francisco Film Critics Circle Awards
 2010: 9th San Francisco Film Critics Circle Awards
 2011: 10th San Francisco Film Critics Circle Awards
 2012: 11th San Francisco Film Critics Circle Awards
 2013: 12th San Francisco Film Critics Circle Awards
 2014: 13th San Francisco Film Critics Circle Awards
 2015: 14th San Francisco Film Critics Circle Awards
 2016: 15th San Francisco Film Critics Circle Awards
 2017: 16th San Francisco Film Critics Circle Awards
 2018: 17th San Francisco Film Critics Circle Awards
 2019: 18th San Francisco Bay Area Film Critics Circle Awards
 2020: 19th San Francisco Bay Area Film Critics Circle Awards
 2021: 20th San Francisco Bay Area Film Critics Circle Awards
 2022: 21st San Francisco Bay Area Film Critics Circle Awards

References

External links
 

 
American film critics associations
Cinema of the San Francisco Bay Area
Arts organizations based in the San Francisco Bay Area
Organizations based in San Francisco
2002 establishments in California